Ania Ahlborn became Amazon's top selling horror novelist with her self published novel Seed. Ahlborn was born in Ciechanów, Poland. She got her degree in English from the University of New Mexico. Ahlborn is currently married and living in Albuquerque, New Mexico. She writes horror thrillers and self published her first novels before she got representation. Her first novel was developed into film by Amazon Studios after it became the number one selling horror novel on the site. She is now published through Simon and Schuster. Her books have been translated into German. In 2015 and 2017 she was nominated for the This is Horror award as well as making the Bram Stoker Award Recommendations list from the Horror Writers Association.

Bibliography

Novels
Seed (2012)
The Neighbors (2012)
The Shuddering (2013)
The Bird Eater (2014)
Within These Walls (2015)
Brother (2015)
The Devil Crept In (2017)
If You See Her (2019)
Dark Across the Bay (2021)

Novellas
The Pretty Ones (2015)
I Call Upon Thee (2017)
Palmetto (2021)

Short stories
"The Governess" (2019) (in the anthology Other Voices, Other Tombs)
"The Debt" (2019) (in the anthology Hex Life: Wicked New Tales of Witchery)

Omnibus
Apart in the Dark (2018) (includes The Pretty Ones and  I Call Upon Thee)

References and sources

Living people
Year of birth missing (living people)
People from Ciechanów
People from Albuquerque, New Mexico
University of New Mexico alumni
21st-century American women writers
American horror writers
Polish emigrants to the United States
Women horror writers